The Chief Medical Officer of Health of Ontario is an independent officer of the Legislative Assembly of Ontario who is supposed to be responsible for the public health of Ontario residents. The office has existed since prior to 1990.

List of Incumbents
 Kieran Moore (June 2021-present)
 David Williams (2016-June 2021)

References

Offices of the Legislative Assembly of Ontario
Canadian health officials
Canadian public health doctors

Chief medical officers by country